Sampson Lewkowicz (born January 10, 1951 in Montevideo) is an Uruguayan-American boxing promoter and manager, whose notable clients have included Sergio Martinez, Magomed Abdusalamov, Javier Fortuna, and Gabriel Campillo. Lewkowicz is also credited for having discovered Manny Pacquiao prior to the Filipino fighter's arrival in the United States, and served as matchmaker for Sultan Ibragimov.

Lewkowicz is the president of Sampson Boxing, a promotional and advising company for boxers. Lewkowicz has gained notable recognition for his role as chief adviser to multi-division world champion Sergio Martinez.

Lewkowicz was also involved in helping create a trust for boxer Magomed Abdusalamov after the boxer collapsed following his fight with Mike Perez.

Lewkowicz is also the promoter of rising super-middleweight David Benavidez who will be fighting for the WBC super-middleweight championship on September 8th 2017 at the Hard Rock Hotel in Las Vegas.

Lewkowicz also manages unified Junior Middleweight world champion, Jeison Rosario. Rosario knocked out Julian Williams in 2019 to win the championship.

References

American boxing promoters
American people of Uruguayan descent
Sportspeople of Uruguayan descent
Sportspeople from Montevideo
1951 births
Living people